Andesiana brunnea is a moth of the Andesianidae family. It is known from a single specimen from Argentina (Isla Victoria, Nahuel Huapi Lake, Neuquen).

The length of the forewings is about 12.4 mm, making it the smallest of the known Andesiana species. It has a generally dark reddish-brown vestiture. The forewing pattern is reduced to a well-defined, dark brown bar composed of erect dense scales at the end of the discal cell. The hindwings are almost denuded of scales, with scattered brown scales along margins and a darker bar along the end of the discal cell as in the forewing.

The single specimen was caught in early October.

External links
 Andesianidae, a new family of monotrysian moths (LepidopteraiAndesianoidea) from austral South America

Andesianidae
Andesianidae of South America
Fauna of the Andes
Moths of South America